Hemiloba is a monotypic moth genus of the family Crambidae described by Charles Swinhoe in 1901. It contains only one species, Hemiloba excisa, described in the same article. It is found in India.

References

Acentropinae
Monotypic moth genera
Taxa named by Charles Swinhoe
Moths of Asia
Crambidae genera